Arturo Mundet Carbó (Sant Antoni de Calonge, 8 April 1879 - Mexico City, 4 July 1965) was a Catalan businessman based in Mexico.

Arturo Mundet came from a family of Catalan cork manufacturers, and first travelled to Mexico to establish a branch of the company business there. In 1902, he created the Sidral Mundet apple flavoured soft drink which was destined to become popular in the Mexican market and beyond.

He was known for his philanthropic work, including the creation of the Recinte Mundet in Barcelona and the Germandat de Sant Antoni de Calonge in his place of birth. The Parque Arturo Mundet in Mexico City bears his name, as does the Casa Hogar para Ancianos Arturo Mundet, an old people's home in the same city.

References 

Businesspeople from Catalonia
Mexican businesspeople
Mexican company founders
Spanish philanthropists
1879 births
1965 deaths
Spanish expatriates in Mexico